The House of Bourbon-Maine was a legitimate branch of the House of Bourbon, being thus part of the Capetian dynasty. It was founded in 1672 when Louis-Auguste de Bourbon, duc du Maine was legitimised by his father, King Louis XIV of France.

History and Founder

Louis-Auguste, founder of the House of Bourbon-Maine, was the first-born illegitimate son of Louis XIV of France and his mistress, Madame de Montespan. 

Immediately after his birth in 1670, he was entrusted to the care of Madame Scarron, one of his mother's acquaintances, who brought him to a private house on the rue de Vaugirard, close to the Luxembourg Palace, in Paris.  In 1672, the king legitimised him and other younger siblings he had fathered with Mme de Montespan.  At the time of his legitimation,  Louis-Auguste received the title of duc du Maine.

In 1692, Louis Auguste married Anne-Louise-Bénédicte de Bourbon-Condé, the daughter of Henry III Jules de Bourbon, prince de Condé.

The Children of the duc du Maine

Louis-Auguste and his wife had seven children, only three of whom lived to adulthood. All died without issue.  

Mademoiselle de Dombes, (11 September 1694 – 15 September 1694);
Louis Constantin de Bourbon, prince de Dombes, (Château de Versailles, 17 November 1695 – 28 September 1698); 
Mademoiselle d'Aumale, (1697 – 24 August 1699); 
Louis-Auguste de Bourbon, prince de Dombes, (château de Versailles, 4 March 1700 – 1 October 1755);
Louis-Charles de Bourbon, comte d'Eu, (Château de Sceaux, 15 October 1701 – château de Sceaux, 13 July 1775); 
Charles de Bourbon, duc d'Aumale, (château de Versailles, 31 March 1704 – château de Sceaux, September 1708); 
Louise-Françoise de Bourbon, titled Mademoiselle du Maine,  (château de Versailles, 4 December 1707 – Château d'Anet, 19 August 1743).

The House of Bourbon-Maine became extinct at the death of Louis Charles de Bourbon, comte d'Eu. It had been in existence for just over a century.

Heads of the House

Ancestry

Other illegitimate houses
Bourbon-Busset
Bourbon-Penthièvre (extinct; cousins of the House of Bourbon-Maine through the duc du Maine's younger brother, the comte de Toulouse)
Second house of Bourbon-Vendôme (extinct)

See also

Counts and Dukes of Maine

 
Dukes of Maine
1672 establishments in France
1775 disestablishments in France